Juline Fayard (born 10 May 2003) is a French tennis player.

Fayard made her WTA main draw debut at the 2021 Lyon Open (WTA), where she received a wildcard into the doubles main draw partnering Loïs Boisson.

References

External links

2003 births
Living people
French female tennis players
21st-century French women